Little Oakley may refer to:
Little Oakley, Essex
Little Oakley, Northamptonshire